Ricardo Martínez (born 28 October 1947) is a Salvadoran former footballer. He competed in the men's tournament at the 1968 Summer Olympics.

References

External links
 
 

1947 births
Living people
Salvadoran footballers
El Salvador international footballers
Olympic footballers of El Salvador
Footballers at the 1968 Summer Olympics
People from Sonsonate Department
Association football goalkeepers
C.D. Águila footballers